Maria Cristina Perez Naranjo (born April 11, 1965 Málaga) is a wheelchair fencing athlete from Spain. She won two bronze medals at the Summer Paralympic Games.

Career 
She trained with Ciudad Jardín Fencing Club.

At the 1992 Summer Paralympics in Barcelona, she won a bronze medal in Women's Épée Team. She competed in Women's Épée Individual 3–4.

At the 1996 Summer Paralympics in Atlanta, she won a bronze medal in Women's Épée team. She competed in Women's Foil Individual A, Women's Épée Individual A, and Women's Épée Team.

She competed at the 1994 World Championships, in Hong Kong, and the 1995 European Championship.

References 

1965 births
Paralympic bronze medalists for Spain
Wheelchair fencers
Living people
Paralympic wheelchair fencers of Spain